Boates may refer to :

 a Gallic tribe in present Gascony, whose civitas Boatium (pays de Born) was among the components of the Roman province of Novempopulania (Aquitania Tertia)

 Individuals
 Brent Boates
 Robert Boates